

List of Ambassadors
Zvi Aviner-Vapni 2015 -
Alexander Ben-Zvi 2010 - 2015
Zeev Boker 2006 - 2010 
Yael Rubinstein 2003-2005
David Granit (Non-Resident, Jerusalem) 2001 - 2003
Yosef Govrin (Non-Resident, Vienna) 1993 - 1995

References

Slovakia
Israel